Westminster 2010: Declaration of Christian Conscience is a Christian manifesto launched on Easter Sunday 2010 in the United Kingdom. It is modelled on the Manhattan Declaration in the United States and addresses the same three concerns: heterosexual marriage, the sanctity of human life, and freedom of conscience. The declaration states that marriage is "the only context for sexual intercourse". Its signatories include the former archbishop of Canterbury Lord Carey of Clifton.

See also
 Manhattan Declaration: A Call of Christian Conscience

External links
 http://www.westminster2010.org.uk/

2010 documents
2010 in Christianity
Christianity and politics
LGBT and Christianity
Manifestos